Gayle and Gillian Blakeney are Australian identical twins who performed together as actresses and as a dance/pop duo in the 1990s, releasing music under the monikers The Twins and Gayle and Gillian. Born in Brisbane on 9 July 1966, Gayle is older by nine minutes. They are most widely known for their stint in the soap opera Neighbours, as twins Caroline and Christina Alessi.

Early career
The girls knew from a young age that they wanted to be on television. After begging their mother to take them to singing lessons, she finally agreed and this led them to various talent quests around South East Queensland. As first prize at one event on the Gold Coast the girls won entry into a televised talent show on the Nine Network.

Gayle and Gillian then starred in numerous television commercials around Australia – including a series of Kelloggs' Corn Flakes commercials. In 1979 they decided to take the next step and auditioned for a lead role in a children's telemovie pilot called "Earth Patrol" starring Spike Milligan. Gillian won the lead children's role of Cassie. However, the producers were delighted with both twins' auditions and planned to write Gayle into the series as her twin sister if the pilot was successful. The pilot was not accepted.

The sisters continued their career in 1980 when they appeared in a video clip for the Australian group The Monitors’ track "Singin' In The '80s", wearing make-up in the style of rock band Kiss. They also appeared in other music videos by The Monitors between 1980 and 1982, most notably "Nobody Told Me" (dressed as schoolgirls in a jail) and "Having You Around Me" (dressed as 'beach babes').
The sisters also presented "Take Your Pick" with Des O'Connor.

The sisters have contrasting personalities. When sharing a flat together, Gillian did the man-about-the-house DIY work, while Gayle did the cooking and housework.

Career
In 1983 they joined the team on the successful national children's programme Wombat, along with the puppet Agro. They enjoyed their roles as reporters for the next seven years. The program also included an ongoing mock soap opera segment.

Another advertising appearance was in the mid-1980s, in a series of futuristic commercials for Coca-Cola, featuring Max Headroom.

In 1990 they joined the cast of the soap opera Neighbours as Caroline Alessi (played by Gillian) and Christina Alessi (played by Gayle). Gillian and Gayle left the show at different stages during 1992.

Following the success of former Neighbours actors Kylie Minogue and Jason Donovan as recording artists, the Blakeneys went to England in 1991 to record with Stock Aitken Waterman, originally going by the name 'The Twins'. The resulting single, "All Mixed Up", became a modest club hit that year, and peaked at #74 in Australia.

After parting with Stock Aitken Waterman, the Blakeneys made a brief return to Neighbours, eventually leaving the show in 1992. In 1993/1994 they released two singles in the United Kingdom as 'Gayle & Gillian', "Mad If Ya Don't" (#75 in the UK Singles Chart in 1993) and a cover version of Prince's "I Wanna Be Your Lover" re-titled "Wanna Be Your Lover" (UK #62 in 1994 and #45 in the Scottish Chart).  .

Afterwards the two made a brief return to television, this time as assistants on the Thames Television revived game show Take Your Pick. While working in the UK, they also acted on stage.

In 1994 the sisters moved to the United States (where they still reside today, as both call Los Angeles home) to pursue acting roles, landing guest spots on various film and TV projects, such as playing ballerinas in Silk Stalkings.

The sisters are married and have children (Gayle has three, while Gillian has one daughter). As of 2015, the Blakeneys have moved on to launching companies and building brands, with Gillian running a scarf line.

In June 2019, it was announced that both sisters would be reprising their roles on Neighbours in September, which will be for a three-episode stint.

Discography

Singles

References

External links
 The Twins – All Mixed Up (video)
 
 
 "Neighbours" Girls: Gayle & Gillian
 Gayle & Gillian Discography
 Fascinated with Gearóid Farrelly (Guest in ep 4 is Gillian Blakeney)

1966 births
Australian dance music groups
Australian electronic musicians
Australian television actresses
Australian expatriate actresses in the United States
Sibling musical duos
Australian girl groups
Identical twin actresses
Living people
People from Brisbane
Australian twins
Musical groups established in the 1990s
Australian child actresses